The Russian Air Force, like the Soviet Air Forces before them, has the aviation regiment as its basic organisational unit. This page will slowly attempt to list all the regiments in Russian Air Force service since May 7, 1992, the date on which Boris Yeltsin decreed the establishment of the Russian Ministry of Defence.

Primary initial source for this listing is Piotr Butowski, 'Force Report: Russian Air Force,' Air Forces Monthly, July and August 2007. Other sources included Jane's World Air Forces, Issue 0, March 1996.

Air Force
Listings of Guards titles cannot yet be considered definitive; there are no doubt errors and omissions in the table.

Army aviation component
In December 2003 all aviation assets of the Russian Ground Forces were transferred to the Air Force.

Index of abbreviations
Although the titles of the regiments are translated, the regiment type sort uses the transliterated Russian abbreviation:

IAP - Fighter Aviation Regiment
BAP - Bomber Aviation Regiment
RAP - Reconnaissance Aviation Regiment
(O)SAP - (Independent) Mixed Aviation Regiment (also sometimes translated as Composite Aviation Regiment)
UAP - Training Aviation Regiment
UVP - Training Helicopter Regiment
'IAP-PVO' indicates the regiment was part of the Air Defence Forces before 1998, and is air defence dedicated. 'IAP-VVS' indicates that a regiment was part of the Air Force before 1998, and, in most cases, they are regiments tasked with attaining tactical air supremacy. Only a few regiments have a type suffix added yet.
TsBPiPLS - Centre for Combat Training and Flight Personnel Training
APIB - Fighter-Bomber Aviation Regiment
APON - Aviation Regiment for Special Purposes
IBAP - Instructor Bomber Aviation Regiment
IISAP - Research Instructor Composite Aviation Regiment
IVTAP - Instructor Military Transport Aviation Regiment
OAPSZ - Independent Air Regiment of Tanker Aircraft
OIAP - Independent Fighter Regiment
OTBVP - Independent Transport-Combat Helicopter Regiment
OSAP - Independent Composite Air Regiment
OTBVP - Independent Transport-Combat Helicopter Regiment
OVP - Independent Helicopter Regiment
OVP BU - Independent Helicopter Regiment for Battle Control
OVTAP - Independent Military Transport Air Regiment
TBAP - Heavy Bomber Aviation Regiment
VTAP - Military Transport Aviation Regiment

Other acronyms include:
AB - Air base
ABON - Air base for Special purposes
ABSDRLO - Air Base of Long-range Radiolocation Detection Aircraft (Airborne early warning and control)
AG - Air group
BRS - Aircraft Reserve Base
BRV - Helicopter Reserve Base
CBPiBP - Centre for Combat Training and Combat Application
CBPiPLS - Centre for Combat Training and Flight Personnel Training
DPVO - Division of the PVO
HQ - Headquarters
KPVO - Corps of PVO (Air Defence Forces)
SAD - Composite Aviation Division
VVS - literally 'Military Air Forces,' the Russian term for the Russian Air Force
VTAD - Military Transport Aviation Division
UCBP - Training Center for Combat Application
VA - Air Army

The Russian word отдельный can be translated as either 'Independent,' 'Separate' or (rarely) 'Detached'; it designates a unit which is directly subordinate to a formation commander without an intermediate echelon, such as an Aviation Division.

References

External links
Soviet and Russian Air Force regiments 1941
Russian Wikipedia List of Current Russian Air Bases

Regiments of the Russian Air Forces
Air